Venusia conisaria is a moth in the family Geometridae first described by George Hampson in 1903. It is found in China, Nepal and India.

Subspecies
Venusia conisaria conisaria (China, Nepal, Sikkim)
Venusia conisaria hypoconia (Prout, 1938) (Kashmir)

References

Moths described in 1903
Venusia (moth)